Nishimura Ekiu v. United States, 142 U.S. 651 (1892), was a United States Supreme Court case challenging the constitutionality of some provisions of the Immigration Act of 1891. The case was decided against the litigant and in favor of the government, upholding the law. The case is one of two major cases that involved challenges to the Immigration Act of 1891 by Japanese immigrants, the other (and more famous) case being Yamataya v. Fisher.

Background

Backdrop of laws 

The United States had essentially unrestricted immigration until 1875. The Page Act of 1875 forbade the immigration of prostitutes and forced laborers from Asia, requiring Asian women to obtain certificates of character from Hong Kong prior to migrating.

Starting in the 1880s, a number of laws were passed that deprived the Chinese of the right to migrate and deprived Chinese migrants of rights. The Angell Treaty of 1880 temporarily banned migration from China, and the Chinese Exclusion Act of 1882 extended the ban on migration of skilled and unskilled laborers for ten years. Around the same time as the Chinese Exclusion Act, the Immigration Act of 1882 was passed. This law set the basic framework for immigration enforcement at sea ports.

The Scott Act (1888) forbade Chinese migrants from re-entering the United States.  This Act was effectively challenged in Chae Chan Ping v. United States, but the United States Supreme Court ruled against the litigant and upheld the law.

Immigration Act of 1891 

The Immigration Act of 1891 focused on the situation of migrants from countries other than China. The Act's key pieces included:

 Additional classes of excludable aliens
 New border procedures and extended authority to land borders: The Act specified that the officers in charge of any vessel arriving by sea had to submit a list of passengers with their biographical information to the immigration inspectors at the port. Requirements of this sort had been part of United States federal law since the requirement for a manifest of immigrants in Section 4 of the Steerage Act of 1819. However, in this case the list needed to be submitted immediately upon arrival and was used to inspect aliens prior to admitting them. The inspectors at ports of entry had the authority to conduct a medical examination of aliens suspected of being unfit or having dangerous diseases, marking the beginning of medical exclusion of immigrants in the United States. Aliens who were detained for a medical examination were still considered to not have formally entered the United States.
 New bureaucratic office to coordinate immigration enforcement
 Authority to deport
 Penalties and restrictions on abetting migration

Of these provisions, it was the new border procedures that would be effectively challenged by the case.

The case

Initial detention by California immigration commissioner and habeas corpus petition 

The case involved Nishimura Ekiu, a 25-year-old female citizen of Japan who arrived on the steamship Belgic from Yokohama, Japan on May 7, 1891. William H. Thornley, commissioner of immigration of the state of California, refused to allow her and five other passengers to land. In a report on May 13, 1891, he elaborated on the reason for denying her entry: "Passport states that she comes to San Francisco in company with her husband, which is not a fact. She states that she has been married two years, and that her husband has been in the United States one year, but she does not know his address. She has $22, and is to stop at some hotel until her husband calls for her." Rather than detaining her on the ship, he decided to detain her at the Methodist Episcopal Japanese and Chinese Mission, a location he deemed more suitable for her to stay, until the date the ship would sail back. His report cited the Immigration Act of 1882. The collector approved Thornley's decision. On the same day (May 13), a writ of habeas corpus was issued to Thornley to produce Ekiu. Thornley replied explaining where he had detained her and said he would continue to detain her there until final disposition of the writ.

Re-examination and rejection of habeas corpus by an immigration inspector 

On May 14, 1891, the secretary of the treasury appointed John L. Hatch, an immigration inspector at the port of San Francisco, to re-examine the case. On May 16, Hatch submitted a report almost identical to that submitted originally by Thornley, except that he also cited the Immigration Act of 1891 in support of the decision. On May 18, Hatch intervened in opposition of the writ of habeas corpus, noting that based on his investigation, Ekiu was 'an alien immigrant from Yokohama, empire of Japan,' and 'a person without means of support, without relatives or friends in the United States,' and "a person unable to care for herself, and liable to become a public charge, and therefore inhibited from landing under the provisions of said act of 1891, and previous acts of which said act is amendatory."

Challenge and loss in the circuit court 

At the hearing before the commissioner of the circuit court, the petitioner offered to introduce evidence as to her right to land; and contended that if the Immigration Act of 1891 allowed immigration bureaucrats to make final decisions on such matters without the possibility of judicial review, it was unconstitutional.

The commissioner excluded the evidence offered as to the petitioner's right to land, noting that the question of that right had been tried and determined by a duly-constituted and competent tribunal having jurisdiction in the premises. Therefore, the court rejected the habeas corpus petition on July 24, 1891.

Supreme Court case 

The appellant, Nishimura Ekiu, then appealed to the United States Supreme Court. The case was heard before the Supreme Court, with Lyman I. Mowry representing the appellant and Assistant Attorney General Packet representing the United States.

The court ruled against the appellant. The court agreed with the appellant that an appellant had the right to challenge, with a writ of habeas corpus, any unlawful detention. For this, it cited Chew Heong v. United States, United States v. Jung Ah Lung, and Wan Shing v. United States as precedents.

However, the court sided with the United States government on the position that the final determination of facts of the case (specifically, whether the appellant had relatives in the United States, and whether she would be able to support herself financially) was to be made by the immigration authorities. A number of precedents, including in domains unrelated to immigration, were cited, such as Martin v. Mott (deference to the President ordering militias into service), Railroad Co. v. Stimpson (a patent dispute where the Supreme Court held that its goal was simply to determine whether the patent office properly handled the case, rather than re-evaluate the case fully on merits), Benson v. McMahon (deference to authorities regarding extradition procedure for crimes), In re Luis Oteiza y Cortes (the Court refused to discharge an officer for complying with an extradition request), and others.

The court also reiterated the position that the management of immigration was under the purview of the executive branch, within parameters set by legislative acts of Congress. The Head Money cases, that had established the legitimacy of a head tax introduced in the Immigration Act of 1882, were cited as precedent for this purpose.

The court also noted that it was not necessary for it to express an opinion on Thornley's actions. Rather, the review by Hatch sufficed for that purpose. It also noted that habeas corpus was simply a means to determine whether somebody could be held in custody, rather that a way to recover damages for unlawful arrest. The court argued that Hatch's appointment and his testimony were valid, and therefore ruled against the appellant.

Dissent 

Justice Brewer dissented from the majority opinion.

Relation with other court cases

Relation with the second Japanese immigrant case 

A later case, Yamataya v. Fisher (1903), bears many similarities with Nishimura Ekiu v. United States. Both cases involved a female Japanese citizen who challenged immigration authorities' decision to let her into the United States, and both sought to challenge the Immigration Act of 1891 that the denial was based on. In both cases, the court ruled against the appellant and declined to consider the specific facts surrounding the appellant's admissibility into the United States. In both cases, the appellant was ultimately deported.

However, the two cases differ in terms of the precedent they set. Whereas Nishimura Ekiu is seen as a complete refusal by the court to consider the appellant's claim, the court did acknowledge the appellant's rights to due process in Yamataya v. Fisher. The court in Yamataya v. Fisher argued that the appeals process within the immigration bureaucracy was sufficient to meet the due process requirements, and the appellant's rights were not violated. However, the very fact that the court opined on the issue set a precedent for future challenges based on procedural due process violations.

Value as a precedent for later doctrines in immigration law 

The case, along with Chae Chan Ping v. United States and Fong Yue Ting v. United States, has been cited as one of the precedents for Supreme Court deference to the plenary power doctrine for immigration law, and the related doctrine of consular nonreviewability. However, the court's more cautious response in Nishimura Ekiu v. United States than in Chae Chan Ping v. United States set a precedent in practice of a greater burden of proof for deportation than for exclusion cases.

In the case and most of the Chinese Exclusion Cases, the Supreme Court repeatedly sided with the United States government and against aliens, offering the rationale that immigration policy and its enforcement were a matter for the legislative and executive branches. Some commentators argue that these cases were key precedents for establishing the plenary power doctrine, whereas others have disagreed about the significance of these cases for plenary power. 
The defining case for the plenary power doctrine, Knauff v. Shaughnessy (1950) did not explicitly cite the case.

References

External links
 
 

United States Supreme Court cases
United States Supreme Court cases of the Fuller Court
United States immigration and naturalization case law
1892 in United States case law
Japanese-American culture in San Francisco
Japan–United States relations